Rudakov is a stratovolcano located in the central part of Urup Island, Kuril Islands, Russia.

See also
 List of volcanoes in Russia

References 
 

Urup
Stratovolcanoes of Russia
Volcanic crater lakes
Holocene stratovolcanoes
Holocene Asia
Volcanoes of the Kuril Islands